Netball South Africa is the peak governing body for the sport of netball in South Africa, with the head office is located in Pretoria. The body rules the practice of the sport in the country and also oversees the National Netball Team.

The executive committee is as follows:
 President - Cecilia Molokwane
Vice President - Christine Du Preez
 CEO - Blanche de la Guerre
 Director of Selections - Nompumelelo Javu
 Director of Umpires: Annie Kloppers
 Director of Demarcation and Structures: Mami Diale
 Director of Coaching: Anneline Lewies

See also
 Netball in South Africa 
 Brutal Fruit Netball Cup
  Telkom Netball League

References

External links
 Official site

South Africa
Sports governing bodies in South Africa
Netball in South Africa
Netball governing bodies in Africa